Marcin Prachnio (born July 14, 1988) is a Polish mixed martial artist currently competing in the Light Heavyweight division of the Ultimate Fighting Championship. A professional mixed martial artist since 2013, Prachnio has also competed in ONE Championship and Final Fight Championship.

Background
After three years of requesting his parents for permission, Prachnio started training karate at the age of 12. Eventually he became multiple-time Polish champion in kyokushin karate and placed second in European championships. Seeking for new challenges, Prachnio moved to Amsterdam in 2013 in order to transition to mixed martial arts.

Mixed martial arts career

Early career
Prachnio started his professional mixed martial arts career in 2013, competing solely in European regional circuit. He fought multiple times in Final Fight Championship promotion, eventually racking up a 9–2 record and claiming the promotion's Light Heavyweight Championship in the process. Prachnio decided to drop to middleweight and not defend his title, leading the title to be vacated.

ONE Championship
After claiming and vacating the Final Fight Championship title, Prachnio signed with the ONE Championship in 2016. Despite previous intentions to drop down to middleweight, he made his promotional debut in heavyweight division against Alexandre Machado at ONE: Tribe of Warriors on February 20, 2016. He won the bout via knockout in the first round.

Prachnio was scheduled to face Vitaly Bigdash for the ONE Middleweight World Championship bout on January 14, 2017, at ONE: Quest for Power. However, Prachnio was forced to withdraw due to injury and was replaced by Aung La Nsang.

He amassed an undefeated 4–0 run in the promotion and was in the title contention before signing with the UFC.

Ultimate Fighting Championship
The successful run in the ONE FC resulted in a contract with the UFC in 2018. In his promotional debut he faced Sam Alvey on February 24, 2018 at UFC on Fox 28. He lost the fight via knockout in the first round.

In his sophomore bout in the organization, Prachnio faced Magomed Ankalaev on September 15, 2018 at UFC Fight Night: Hunt vs. Oleinik. He lost the bout via knockout in the first round.

Prachnio faced Mike Rodríguez on August 22, 2020 at UFC on ESPN 15. He lost the fight via knockout in the first round.

Prachnio faced Khalil Rountree Jr. on January 24, 2021 at UFC 257. He won the fight via unanimous decision.

Prachnio faced Ike Villanueva on June 26, 2021 at UFC Fight Night 190. He won the fight via knockout out in round two. This fight earned him the Performance of the Night award.

Prachnio was scheduled to face Azamat Murzakanov on November 20, 2021 at UFC Fight Night 198. However, the bout was later scrapped due to visa issues.

Prachnio faced Philipe Lins on April 23, 2022 at UFC Fight Night 205. He lost the fight via unanimous decision.

Prachnio was scheduled to face William Knight on November 19, 2022, at UFC Fight Night 215. However, the bout was scrapped the week of the event for undisclosed reasons. The bout was rescheduled for UFC Fight Night 219 on February 18, 2023. He won the fight via unanimous decision.

Personal life
Marcin and his wife have a daughter.

Championships and accomplishments

Mixed martial arts 
 Ultimate Fighting Championships
Performance of the Night (One time) 
Final Fight Championship
Final Fight Championship Light Heavyweight Championship (one time)

Mixed martial arts record

|-
|Win
|align=center|16–6
|William Knight
|Decision (unanimous)
|UFC Fight Night: Andrade vs. Blanchfield
|
|align=center|3
|align=center|5:00
|Las Vegas, Nevada, United States
|
|-
|Loss
|align=center|15–6
|Philipe Lins
|Decision (unanimous)
|UFC Fight Night: Lemos vs. Andrade
|
|align=center|3
|align=center|5:00
|Las Vegas, Nevada, United States
|
|-
|Win
|align=center|15–5
|Ike Villanueva
|KO (body kick)
|UFC Fight Night: Gane vs. Volkov 
|
|align=center|2
|align=center|0:56
|Las Vegas, Nevada, United States
|
|-
| Win
| align=center|14–5
| Khalil Rountree Jr.
| Decision (unanimous)
| UFC 257 
| 
| align=center|3
| align=center|5:00
| Abu Dhabi, United Arab Emirates
|
|-
| Loss
| align=center|13–5
| Mike Rodríguez
| KO (elbow and punches)
| UFC on ESPN: Munhoz vs. Edgar
| 
| align=center|1
| align=center|2:17
| Las Vegas, Nevada, United States
|
|-
| Loss
| align=center| 13–4
| Magomed Ankalaev
| TKO (head kick and punches)
| UFC Fight Night: Hunt vs. Oleinik 
| 
| align=center|1
| align=center|3:09
| Moscow, Russia
|
|-
| Loss
| align=center| 13–3
| Sam Alvey
| KO (punch)
| UFC on Fox: Emmett vs. Stephens
| 
| align=center|1
| align=center|4:23
| Orlando, Florida, United States
|
|-
| Win
| align=center| 13–2
| Gilberto Galvão
| KO (punch)
| ONE: Kings & Conquerors
| 
| align=center| 1
| align=center| 1:23
| Macau, SAR, China
| 
|-
| Win
| align=center| 12–2
| Jake Butler
| TKO (knees)
| ONE: Titles and Titans
| 
| align=center| 1
| align=center| 2:30
| Jakarta, Indonesia
|
|-
| Win
| align=center| 11–2
| Leandro Ataides
| Decision (split)
| ONE: Kingdom of Champions
| 
| align=center| 3
| align=center| 5:00
| Bangkok, Thailand
| 
|-
| Win
| align=center| 10–2
| Alexandre Machado
| TKO (punches)
| ONE: Tribe of Warriors
| 
| align=center| 1
| align=center| 2:44
| Jakarta, Indonesia
| 
|-
| Win
| align=center|9–2
| Tomislav Spahović
| TKO (punches)
| Final Fight Championship 21
| 
| align=center|1
| align=center|3:22
| Rijeka, Croatia
|
|-
| Win
| align=center|8–2
| Matej Batinić
| Decision (unanimous)
| Final Fight Championship 19
| 
| align=center|3
| align=center|5:00
| Linz, Austria
|
|-
| Win
| align=center|7–2
| Ryan Salamagnou
| TKO (punches)
| HIT Fighting Championship
| 
| align=center|1
| align=center|0:21
| Zürich, Switzerland
|
|-
| Win
| align=center|6–2
| Elvir Cosic
| TKO (punches)
| Bosnian Fight Championship 2
| 
| align=center|1
| align=center|1:34
| Sarajevo, Bosnia and Herzegovina
|
|-
| Loss
| align=center| 5–2
| Aleksandar Rakić
| TKO (punches)
| Final Fight Championship 16 
| 
| align=center|3
| align=center|3:00
| Vienna, Austria
| 
|-
| Win
| align=center| 5–1
| Stepjan Bekavac
| TKO (knees)
| Final Fight Championship 14
| 
| align=Center|1
| align=center|0:35
| Ljubljana, Slovenia
| 
|-
| Win
| align=center| 4–1
| Milco Voorn
| TKO (punches)
| Fight Club Den Haag 2014
| 
| align=center| 1
| align=center| 3:40
| The Hague, Netherlands
| 
|-
| Win
| align=center| 3–1
| Bozo Mikulic
| TKO (punches)
| Final Fight Championship 13
| 
| align=center| 1
| align=center| 2:56
| Zadar, Croatia
| 
|-
| Loss
| align=center| 2–1
| Ivica Tadijanov
| Decision (unanimous)
| Final Fight Championship 11
| 
| align=center| 3
| align=center| 5:00
| Osijek, Croatia
| 
|-
| Win
| align=center| 2–0
| Milan Vinčić
| Submission (rear-naked choke)
| Bosnia Fight Championship 1
| 
| align=center| 1
| align=center| 1:46
| Sarajevo, Bosnia and Herzegovina
|
|-
| Win
| align=center| 1–0
| Tomas Siaucila
| KO (punch)
| Ultimate Warrior Challenge 23
| 
| align=center| 1
| align=center| 1:11
| Essex, England
|

See also 
 List of current UFC fighters
 List of male mixed martial artists

References

External links 
  
 

1988 births
Living people
Sportspeople from Warsaw
Polish male mixed martial artists
Light heavyweight mixed martial artists
Ultimate Fighting Championship male fighters
Mixed martial artists utilizing Kyokushin kaikan
Mixed martial artists utilizing Brazilian jiu-jitsu
Polish practitioners of Brazilian jiu-jitsu
Polish male karateka